The Mayfield Downtown Commercial District is a historic district in Mayfield, Kentucky which was listed on the National Register of Historic Places in 1984.  The listing was increased in 1996.

The original  area included 77 contributing buildings;  the  increase added 21 more.

It includes the Graves County Courthouse, built in 1888 at cost of $40,000, the fourth courthouse at the location.

Many of the buildings in the district, including the courthouse, suffered major to catastrophic damage on December 10–11, 2021, as a long-track EF4 tornado directly hit the city.

References

National Register of Historic Places in Graves County, Kentucky
Victorian architecture in Kentucky
Neoclassical architecture in Kentucky
Historic districts on the National Register of Historic Places in Kentucky
Prairie School architecture
Early Commercial architecture in the United States
Courthouses in Kentucky